The ICTCM Award is presented each year at the International Conference on Technology in Collegiate Mathematics sponsored by Pearson Addison–Wesley & Pearson Prentice Hall publishers. This award, now in its twelfth year, was established by Pearson Education to recognize an individual or group for excellence and innovation in using technology to enhance the teaching and learning of mathematics. Electronic conference proceedings are available beginning with ICTCM 7. List of free electronic journals in mathematics

ICTCM Award recipients

1997 Chicago, ICTCM-10
 To: Paul Velleman, Cornell University
 For: ActiveStats

1998 New Orleans, ICTCM-11
 To: Laurie Hopkins, Columbia College, SC and Amelia Kinard, Columbia College, SC
 For: An Update on the Impact of handheld CAS Systems on Developmental Algebra
 To: Deborah Hughes Hallett, University of Arizona; Eric Connally, Wellesley College; Rajini Jesudason, Wellesley College (Currently: Benjamin Banneker Charter Public School); Ralph Teixeira, Harvard University; and Graeme Bird, Harvard University
 For: Information, Data and Decisions
 To: John C. Miller, The City College of CUNY
 For: xyAlgebra: Algebra Courseware with Intelligent Help at Every Step

1999 San Francisco, ICTCM-12
 To: Michael E. Gage (et al.), University of Rochester and Arnold K. Pizer, University of Rochester
 For: WeBWork
 To: Christopher Weaver, New Mexico State University
 For: Mathematics Accessible to Visually Impaired Students

2000 Atlanta, ICTCM-13
 To: Deborah Hughes Hallett, University of Arizona and Richard Thompson, University of Arizona
 For: Computer Texts for Business Mathematics

2001 Baltimore, ICTCM-14
 To: Bob Richardson, Massey University, New Zealand and Brian Felkel, Appalachian State University, Boone, NC
 For: Networked Business Mathematics

2002 Orlando, ICTCM-15
 To: Robert L. Devaney, Boston University
 For: The Dynamical Systems and Technology Project

2003 Chicago, ICTCM-16
 To: James H. Curry, University of Colorado and Anne Dougherty, University of Colorado,
 For: Mathematics Visualization Toolkit

2004 New Orleans, ICTCM-17
 To: Mike Martin, Johnson County Community College, Overland Park, KS and Steven J. Wilson, Johnson County Community College, Overland Park, KS
 For: Dynamic Web Tools for Undergraduate Mathematics

2006 Orlando, ICTCM-18
 To: Sarah L. Mabrouk, Framingham State College, Framingham, MA 
 For: 'Interactive MS Excel Workbooks

2007 Boston, ICTCM-19
 To: Mark H. Holmes, Rensselaer Polytechnic Institute
 For: Integrating the Learning of Mathematics and Science Using Interactive Teaching and Learning Strategies

2008 San Antonio, ICTCM-20
 To: Douglas B. Meade, University of South Carolina and Philip B. Yasskin, Texas A&M University
 For: Maplets for Calculus, Tutoring without the Tutor'

2009 New Orleans, ICTCM-21
 To: Douglas Ensley, Shippensburg University and Barbara Kaskosz, University of Rhode Island
 For: Flash and Math Applets: Learn by Example2010 Chicago, ICTCM-22
 To: Paul Seeburger, Monroe Community College
 For: Dynamic Visualization for Multivariable Calculus2011 Denver, ICTCM-23
 To: Mamikon Mnatsakanian, California Institute of Technology and Hui Fang Huang "Angie" Su, Nova Southeastern University
 For: Shapes and Numbers: From Counting to Calculus and Beyond''

See also

 List of mathematics awards

References

Mathematics awards
Awards established in 1997